The third season of That's So Raven aired on Disney Channel from October 1, 2004 to January 16, 2006. The season deals with the Baxter family, Raven (Raven-Symoné), Cory (Kyle Massey), Tanya (T'Keyah Crystal Keymáh) and Victor Baxter (Rondell Sheridan) as they continue to manage with Raven and her ability to see into the future. Orlando Brown and Anneliese van der Pol co-stars as Raven's best friends, Eddie Thomas and Chelsea Daniels.

The episode "Too Much Pressure," which aired on June 17, 2005, broke Disney Channel records by being the 66th episode of the series, the first to break the 65-episode contract. The hour long episode, "Country Cousins," which aired on July 29, 2005, broke Disney Channel records again by scoring 10.8 million viewers, the highest broadcast on the network in its history. This feat would later be beaten by High School Musical 2. That's So Raven was officially called the network's highest-rated series during its third year run.

Guest stars for this season included: Rose Abdoo, James Avery, Yvette Nicole Brown, Mary Jo Catlett, Caitlin Crosby, Kathie Lee Gifford, Juliette Goglia, Allie Grant, Macy Gray, Mary Gross, Jackée Harry, David Henrie, Claudia Jordan, Cyndi Lauper, Cody Linley, Susan Lucci, Christopher Massey, Jonathan McDaniel, Taylor Negron, Della Reese, Erica Rivera, Giovonnie Samuels, Drew Sidora, Mindy Sterling, Alyson Stoner, Bobb'e J. Thompson, Ricky Ullman, Travis Van Winkle, Rheagan Wallace, Tiffany Haddish, and Kym Whitley.

This is the final season to feature T'Keyah Crystal Keymáh as Tanya Baxter. 

This is the last season produced by Brookwell McNamara Entertainment.

Cast
Raven-Symoné as Raven Baxter
Orlando Brown as Eddie Thomas
Anneliese van der Pol as Chelsea Daniels
Kyle Massey as Cory Baxter
T'Keyah Crystal Keymáh as Tanya Baxter
Rondell Sheridan as Victor Baxter

Production
This season was filmed from April 2004 to May 2005.

Production staff
Sean McNamara - executive producer
David Brookwell - executive producer
Marc Warren - executive producer
Dennis Rinsler - executive producer
Dava Savel - co-executive producer (episodes 1-30) 
Michael Carrington - co-executive producer 
Michael Feldman - supervising producer
Tom Burkhard - consulting producer (episodes 30-35) 
Al Sonja Rice - consulting producer (episodes 30-35)
Sarah Jane Cunningham and Suzie V. Freeman - producers (episodes 1-30) 
Patty Gary Cox - producer

Episodes

 This season consists of 35 episodes.

References

2004 American television seasons
2005 American television seasons
2006 American television seasons
Season 3